Dell'Orefice may refer to:
Carmen Dell'Orefice, American model and actress.
Giuseppe Dell'Orefice, Italian composer.
La bottega dell'orefice, a 1988 Italian-Austrian-Canadian-German drama film.